WJNI-LD, UHF digital channel 31, is a low-powered YTA TV-affiliated television station licensed to North Charleston, South Carolina, United States. Owned by Jabar Communications, it is a sister station to WJNI-FM.

Previously, WJNI-LD was affiliated with the UATV network; however, UATV suspended operations indefinitely on May 1, 2006.

External links
Jabar Communications

JNI-CD
Television channels and stations established in 1999
Low-power television stations in the United States
1999 establishments in South Carolina